Ivory Coast submitted a film for the Academy Award for Best International Feature Film for the first time in 1976. The award is handed out annually by the United States Academy of Motion Picture Arts and Sciences to a feature-length motion picture produced outside the United States that contains primarily non-English dialogue. It was not created until the 1956 Academy Awards, in which a competitive Academy Award of Merit, known as the Best Foreign Language Film Award, was created for non-English speaking films, and has been given annually since. The country has only submitted three films: one in 1976, another one in 2015, and another one in 2020. The first submission won the award, whilst the second was not nominated and the 2020 submission made the shortlist.

Submissions
The Academy of Motion Picture Arts and Sciences has invited the film industries of various countries to submit their best film for the Academy Award for Best Foreign Language Film since 1956. The Foreign Language Film Award Committee oversees the process and reviews all the submitted films. Following this, they vote via secret ballot to determine the five nominees for the award. Below is a list of the films that have been submitted by Ivory Coast for review by the Academy for the award by year and the respective Academy Awards ceremony.

Notes

References

Ivory Coast
Academy Award for Best Foreign Language Film